Paris is the third studio album by French singer Zaz, released on 10 November 2014 by Jo & Co, Play On and Warner Music France.

Track listing

Notes
  signifies French adaptation

Charts

Weekly charts

Year-end charts

Certifications

Notes

References

2014 albums
Albums produced by Quincy Jones
French-language albums
Zaz (singer) albums
Warner Music France albums